Below is a list of notable low-code development platforms.

Implementations

AppSheet is a no-code application from Google that offers users the ability to create applications for mobile, tablet and web.
Acceleo is an open-source code generator for Eclipse used to generate any textual language (Java, PHP, Python, etc.) from EMF models defined from any metamodel (UML, SysML, etc.).
Actifsource is a plugin for Eclipse that allows graphical modelling and model-based code generation using custom templates.
Appian is an enterprise low-code automation platform for mobile application development. The platform includes a visual interface and pre-built development modules to speed up development.
Betty Blocks, a software-as-a-service no-code platform
Caspio, a low-code application development platform for creating online databases and web applications
DMS Software Reengineering Toolkit is a system for defining arbitrary domain specific languages and translating them to other languages.
Claris FileMaker is a low-code development platform that helps problem-solvers of all skill levels create, share, and integrate custom apps quickly. It combines the data, business logic, and user interface layers to deliver customized, flexible apps that work seamlessly across all devices, on the web, on-premise, or in the cloud. 
GeneXus is a cross-platform, knowledge representation-based development tool, mainly oriented to enterprise-class applications for Web applications, smart devices and the Microsoft Windows platform. A developer describes an application in a high-level, mostly declarative language, from which native code is generated for multiple environments.
Jam.py is a free and open-source development platform for database-driven business web applications, based on DRY principle, with emphasis on CRUD.
The Maple computer algebra system offers code generators for Fortran, MATLAB, C and Java. Wolfram Language (Mathematica), and MuPAD have comparable interfaces.
Microsoft Power Fx is a free and open-source low-code, general-purpose programming language for expressing logic across the Microsoft Power Platform.
OSBP is a software factory provided as Open Source by the Eclipse Foundation. It combines no-code/low-code elements with classic software development. Coding is largely replaced by a descriptive modeling of the desired software, while allowing developers to integrate their own source code. The applications are intended for professional use in companies.
Oracle APEX permits developers to go from no code to low-code to more code.
OutSystems is a low-code platform for omnichannel enterprise application development.
Salesforce is a low code platform for enterprise application development, especially CRM and ERP.
Servoy is a low code / RAD platform for omnichannel core systems and systems of engagement. It is entirely focused on software vendors, building products. It gives full freedom in both the UX and business logic whilst maintaining productivity
Spring Roo is an open source active code generator for Spring Framework based Java applications. It uses AspectJ mixins to provide separation of concerns during round-trip maintenance.
RISE is a free information modeling suite for system development using ERD or UML. Database code generation for MySQL, PostgreSQL and Microsoft SQL Server. Persistence code generation for C# (.NET) and PHP including both SOAP and JSON style web services and AJAX proxy code.
Trackvia, a low-code platform first released in 2007
UiPath is a low-code / no-code development platform for enterprise automation and robotic process automation (RPA)
Uniface is a leading provider of model-driven, low code application development software for developers, enterprises and ISV's enabling business critical applications.
WaveMaker is an enterprise low-code platform mainly oriented towards core application development and delivery users. The applications created are largely open-standards-based and the tool can be used to generate code in the background by drag and drop visual development.

See also
 Compiler optimization
 Declarative programming
 Graphical user interface
 Integrated development environment (IDE)
 Refactor
 Robotic Process Automation (RPA)
 Snippet management
 User interface markup language
 wizard (software)

References

Programming paradigms
Source code generation
Lists of software